Pełczyn may refer to the following places in Poland:
Pełczyn, Lower Silesian Voivodeship (south-west Poland)
Pełczyn, Lublin Voivodeship (east Poland)
Pełczyn, Greater Poland Voivodeship (west-central Poland)